Louise Ann London is the author the book Whitehall and the Jews, 1933-1948 (2000), credited as a scholarly addition to the historical interest in Jewish immigration, and shortlisted for the Jewish Quarterly-Wingate Prize in 2001.

She was born to Jewish refugees and qualified as a lawyer. Her book Whitehall and the Jews, 1933-1948, was based on her thesis completed in 1992 from the University of London.

Selected publications

Books

Articles

References

British women writers
Date of birth unknown
Living people
British Jewish writers
Jewish scholars
English women lawyers
Year of birth missing (living people)